Los Angeles City Council District 11 is one of the 15 districts of the Los Angeles City Council, representing the Westside of the city to the Pacific Ocean.   Traci Park is the district's current representative on the City Council.

Geography

Present day district

The 11th District is bounded by Mulholland Drive on the north, the Pacific Ocean on the west, Imperial Highway on the south and roughly the 405 freeway on the east.   The district covers all or a portion of the following: Brentwood, Del Rey, Mar Vista, Marina del Rey, Pacific Palisades, Palms, Playa del Rey, Playa Vista, Sawtelle, Venice, West Los Angeles, Westchester and the Los Angeles International Airport.

See official city map outlining District 11.

Historical locations
In 1925, when it was first mapped, it covered an area just south of Downtown, but three years later it was transferred to the Westside of the city

A new city charter effective in 1925  replaced the former "at large" voting system for a nine-member council with a district system with a 15-member council. Each district was to be approximately equal in population, based upon the voting in the previous gubernatorial election; thus redistricting was done every four years. (At present, redistricting is done every ten years, based upon the preceding U.S. census results.) The numbering system established in 1925 for City Council districts began with No. 1 in the north of the city, the San Fernando Valley, and ended with No. 15 in the south, the Harbor area.

The 11th District originally encompassed an area south of Downtown, bounded on the north by Sixth Street, on the south by  Pico Boulevard, on the west by Hoover Avenue and on the east approximately by San Pedro Street].

Rough boundaries or descriptions of the 11th District have been as follows:

1926: Westlake, with district headquarters at 431 West Seventh Street (the present site of the Los Angeles Athletic Club).

1928: "The Eleventh District is removed bodily from the downtown section of the city and transplanted to the coast region . . . . Its area includes Venice, Redondo and Palms."

1932–33: "A scattered area, due to its inclosure of county territory. Its eastern boundary is La Brea Avenue, its north boundary is Pico Boulevard, its southern boundary the city limits and its western boundary the ocean."

1937: Venice, Palms and the coast with the east boundary at Rimpau and Crenshaw boulevards.

1940: Irregular district shown here on a map.

1957: Parts of West Los Angeles, Westwood, Pacific Palisades, Brentwood, Mar Vista and Palms.

1960: Venice was shifted into the 11th District from the 6th District.

1971. Pacific Palisades, Brentwood, West Los Angeles, with sections of Tarzana, Encino, Rancho Park, Westdale, Mar Vista and Venice. It covered 52 square miles and had some 210,000 residents.

1997. "Its 73 square miles, bisected by the Santa Monica Mountains, include ritzy hillside enclaves stretching from Woodland Hills to Encino, Pacific Palisades to Brentwood. Poorer parts of Van Nuys and the West Los Angeles flatlands are included as well."

Officeholders
The 11th District has been represented by ten men and two woman.

See also
 Los Angeles City Council districts
 List of Los Angeles municipal election returns

References

Note: Access to most Los Angeles Times links requires the use of a library card.

External links
 Official Los Angeles City Council District 11 website
 Detailed city street map showing District 11 boundaries

Los Angeles City Council districts
LACD11
Brentwood, Los Angeles
Mar Vista, Los Angeles
Pacific Palisades, Los Angeles
Playa del Rey, Los Angeles
Playa Vista, Los Angeles
Venice, Los Angeles
LACD11
Westchester, Los Angeles
Los Angeles International Airport
LACD11
LACD11